Macronychini is a tribe of riffle beetles in the family Elmidae. There are more than 20 genera and 80 described species in Macronychini.

Genera
These 22 genera belong to the tribe Macronychini:

 Aulacosolus Jäch & Boukal, 1997
 Cuspidevia Jäch & Boukal, 1995
 Eonychius Jäch & Boukal, 1996
 Graphosolus Jäch & Kodada, 1996
 Haraldaria Jäch & Boukal, 1996
 Homalosolus Jäch & Kodada, 1996
 Indosolus Bollow, 1940
 Jilanzhunychus Jäch & Boukal, 1995
 Loxostirus Jäch & Kodada, 1996
 Macronevia Jäch & Boukal, 1996
 Macronychus Mueller, 1806
 Nesonychus Jäch & Boukal, 1997
 Okalia Kodada & Ciampor, 2003
 Paramacronychus Nomura, 1958
 Podonychus Jäch & Kodada, 1997
 Prionosolus Jäch & Kodada, 1997
 Rhopalonychus Jäch & Kodada, 1996
 Sinonychus Jäch & Boukal, 1995
 Urumaelmis Satô, 1963
 Vietelmis Delève, 1968
 Zaitzevia Champion, 1923
 Zaitzeviaria Nomura, 1959

References

Further reading

External links

 

Elmidae